The Ministry for the Ecological Transition and the Demographic Challenge (MITECO) is the department of the Government of Spain responsible for developing the government policy on fight against climate change, prevention of pollution, protecting the natural heritage, biodiversity, forests, sea, water and energy for a more ecological and productive social model. Likewise, it is responsible for the elaboration and development of the government policy against the country's demographic challenges (population ageing, territorial depopulation, floating population effects, etc.).

It corresponds to the MITECO the elaboration of the national legislation on waters and coasts, environment, climate change, meteorology and climatology; the direct management of the hydraulic public domain (all types of surface and groundwater), of the maritime-terrestrial public domain (territorial waters, inland waters, natural resources of the exclusive economic zone and the continental shelf, as well as beaches and coasts); the representation of the Kingdom in the international organizations corresponding to these matters; as well as the coordination of actions, cooperation and agreement in the design and application of all policies that affect the scope of competences of the regions and the other public administrations, encouraging their participation through the cooperation bodies and instruments adequate.

Likewise, it corresponds to the Ministry the development of the national energy and mining policy, together with the measures aimed at ensuring the energy supply, guaranteeing a correct regulation of the sector and the analysis and monitoring of these markets, together with mining competencies, all within the framework of the ecological transition.

The MITECO is headed by the Ecological Transition Minister, who is appointed by the Monarch at request of the Prime Minister. Other high officials of the ministry are the Secretary of State for Energy, the Secretary of State for Environment, the Secretary-General for the Demographic Challenge and the Under-Secretary of the Department. The current minister is Teresa Ribera since 2018.

History
The history of environmental policy in Spain reaches back to the 18th century, when the Ordinances for Conservation and the Increase of the Marine Mountains and for the Increase and Conservation of Forests and Plantings were promulgated (1748).

The Royal Decree of November 9, 1832, gave the newly created Ministry of Public Works jurisdiction over the planting and conservation of the mountains and trees, as well as the irrigation and drainage works of marshy lands. A year later, the Directorate-General for Forests was created, the first administration dedicated to the conservation of nature. By Royal Decree of 31 May 1837, it was established that the mounts and plantations which belonged the Crown and of unknown owner, as belonging to the Nation, they would be administered by the government. The government body entrusted with this task was the Directorate-General for Forests. In 1855 the Forestry Advisory Board was founded.

In the 20th century, the competences in the environment were varying in rank, being mere commissions, directorates-general or even secretaries of State.

All these competences of the ministry were varying between the ministries of development, agriculture and presidency, until 1993 when the term "Environment" reached the rank of ministry, creating the Ministry of Public Works, Transport and Environment.

But it was not until 1996 when the Environment obtained its own ministry during the presidency of José María Aznar, creating the Ministry of Environment that was in force until 2011 (in 2008 the Ministry assumed the powers in Rural and Marine Environment). In 2011, the new prime minister Mariano Rajoy merged this ministry with the Ministry of Agriculture, creating the Ministry of Agriculture, Food and Environment (2011-2016) and later the Ministry of Agriculture and Fisheries, Food and Environment (2016-2018).

In 2018, with the arrival of Pedro Sánchez to the premiership, he regained the ministry's autonomy by creating a ministry focused on carrying out an energy transition towards more ecological means of production, the Ministry for the Ecological Transition. For this purpose Sánchez appointed Teresa Ribera as minister and her ministry assumed for the first time responsibilities on energy policy, a policy that historically belonged to the ministries of Industry or Economy.

In 2020, in order to improve the environmental policies that this department was doing, the Prime Minister promoted minister Ribera to the rank of Deputy Prime Minister and it trusted her the responsibilities on the different demographic challenges that Spain had. Nowadays, the official name (in Spanish) is Ministerio para la Transición Ecológica y el Reto Demográfico as a new, changed name from the previously named Ministerio del Medio Ambiente.

Denomination of the Ministry 
Despite its long history, the agency did not reach the rank of ministry until 1993:

 Ministry of Public Works, Transport and Environment (1993-1996)
 Ministry of Environment (1996-2008)
 Ministry of Environment and Rural and Marine Affairs (2008-2011)
 Ministry of Agriculture, Food and Environment (2011-2016)
 Ministry of Agriculture and Fisheries, Food and Environment (2016-2018)
 Ministry for the Ecological Transition (2018-2020)
 Ministry for the Ecological Transition and Demographic Challenge (2020-)

Structure 
The Ministry's structure is:

 The Secretariat of State for Energy
 The Commissioner for the Promotion of Sustainable Energy in the Islands, created to coordinate and promote public policies for sustainable energy in the Balearic and Canary archipelagos.
 The Directorate-General for Energy Policy and Mines
The Deputy Directorate-General for Energy Foresight, Strategy and Regulation
 The Secretariat of State for Environment
 The Directorate-General for Water
 The Spanish Office for Climate Change
 The Directorate-General for Environmental Quality and Evaluation
 The Directorate-General for the Coast and the Sea
The Directorate-General for Biodiversity, Forests and Desertification
 The General Secretariat for the Demographic Challenge.
The Directorate-General for Depopulation Policies
The Undersecretariat for the Ecologial Transition
 The Technical General Secretariat
The Directorate-General for Services
The Deputy Directorate-General for International Relations

Ministry agencies and enterprises 

National Parks Autonomous Agency.
 State Meteorological Agency.
 Institute for Just Transition.
 Institute for the Diversification and Saving of Energy.
 City of Energy Foundation.
 Biodiversity Foundation.
 National Company of Radioactive Waste.
 Strategic Reserves of Petroleum Products Corporation.

Ministers of Environment

Reign of Juan Carlos I (1975-2014)

Reign of Felipe VI (2014-present)

References

External links 
 Ministry of Environment 

Environment
Environment of Spain
Environment ministries
Environment
Ministries established in 1993
1993 establishments in Spain
Environment